Anna White (21 Jan. 1831 – 16 Dec. 1910) was a Shaker Eldress, social reformer, author, and hymn writer.

Biography
Anna White born in Brooklyn, New York, the third daughter of five children of Robert White and Hannah (Gibbs) White. Her parents were both Quakers, her father having joined by marriage. One of her earliest memories was hearing anti-slavery lecturer Lucretia Mott speak, but she was disturbed when Mott was "abruptly silenced by the guardians of Quaker orthodoxy." She went to a Quaker school in Poughkeepsie, New York called Mansion Square Seminary, and had a strong social conscience influenced by both her faith and her parents.

White became interested in the Shakers after her father joined Hancock Shaker Village, where he had done business. Anna was the only member of the family to join her father in the religion, joining the Mount Lebanon Shaker Society's North Family at 18 years old in 1849. Joining the Shakers alienated both of them from the rest of the family, with a rich uncle even threatening to dis-inherent her of  if she went through with it.

The music of the Shakers were one of the things that had initially attracted her to the religion, and she would go on to write hundreds of spiritual songs, and compile two books of Shaker music which included some of her own hymns.

In 1865, White became second eldress to Antoinette Doolittle, and upon Doolittle's death in 1887, became first eldress. She became a vegetarian following the example of Elder Frederick Evans of the Mount Lebanon Society, and the rest of the North Family followed her example.

White was an active advocate for social reform and pacifism. She wrote in support of Alfred Dreyfus during the Dreyfus affair. She gave a number of speeches, most notably those at the Universal Peace Union, the Equal Rights Club, and at a peace conference at Mount Lebanon. The resolutions written at the Mount Lebanon meeting in 1905 were forwarded to The Hague, and subsequently adopted, and were brought to President Theodore Roosevelt by White personally. She also wrote a number of articles, was a leader in Alliance of Women for Peace and National Council of Women, and a member of the National American Woman Suffrage Association.

In 1904, White cowrote Shakerism: Its Meaning and Message with Eldress Leila S. Taylor, which at the time, was the only published history of the Shaker movement written by one of its members. The book joined Shaker principles and socially progressive values such as women's equality.

White died on the 16th of December, 1910.

References

Further reading
 

1831 births
1910 deaths
People from New Lebanon, New York
Shaker members
Religious leaders from New York (state)
Female religious leaders
American feminists
Historical preservationists
American women historians
American Christian hymnwriters
American women hymnwriters
19th-century American women musicians
Historians from New York (state)